Whatever Julie Wants is an LP album by Julie London, released by Liberty Records under catalog number LRP-3192 as a monophonic recording and catalog number LST-7192 in stereo in 1961.

For the cover photograph of this release Julie London had herself photographed in furs, jewels, and $750,000 in U.S. bills.  A team of armed police officers were also present on the set.

Track listing
 "Why Don't You Do Right?" - (Kansas Joe McCoy)–2:17
 "My Heart Belongs to Daddy" - (Cole Porter)–2:41 
 "Hard Hearted Hannah" - (Jack Yellen, Bob Bigelow, Charles Bates, Milton Ager)– 1:56
 "Do It Again" - (George Gershwin, Buddy DeSylva)– 2:19
 "Take Back Your Mink" - (Frank Loesser)– 2:21
 "Diamonds Are a Girl's Best Friend" - (Jule Styne, Leo Robin)– 1:59
 "Daddy" - (Bobby Troup)– 2:12
 "An Occasional Man" - (Hugh Martin, Ralph Blane)– 2:29
 "Love for Sale" - (Cole Porter)– 2:40
 "Always True to You in My Fashion" - (Cole Porter)– 2:25
 "There'll Be Some Changes Made" - (Benton Overstreet, William Blackstone)– 2:25
 "Tired" - (Doris Fisher, Allan Roberts)– 2:38

Orchestra produced by Felix Slatkin.

References

Liberty Records albums
1960 albums
Julie London albums
1961 albums